The Associazione Guide Esploratori Cattolici Sammarinesi (AGECS, Sanmarinese Catholic Guide and Scout Association) is the national Scouting and Guiding association of San Marino. Scouting and Guiding in San Marino started within the respective Italian organizations and became independent in 1973. It became a member of the World Organization of the Scout Movement in 1990 and is also an associate member of the World Association of Girl Guides and Girl Scouts. The association serves 152 Scouts (as of 2011) and 120 Guides (as of 2003).

Program and ideals
The Scout emblem incorporates the color scheme of the flag of San Marino.

Scout Oath
Con l'aiuto di Dio, prometto sul mio Onore di fare del mio meglio per compiere il mio dovere verso Dio e verso il mio paese, per aiutare gli altri in ogni circostanza, per osservare la Legge Scout.

With God's help, I promise on my honour to do my best, to do my duty to God and my country, to help others in every circumstance and to observe the Scout Law.

Scout Law
La guida e lo Scout:The Guide and the Scout:
pongono il loro onore nel meritare fuduciaput their honor in being trusted
sono lealiare loyal
si rendono utili ed aiutano gli altrimake themselves useful and help others
sono amici di tutti e Fratelli di ogni altra Guida e Scoutare friends to all and brothers to all other Guides and Scouts
sono cortesiare courteous
amano e rispettano la naturalove and respect nature
sanno obbedireknow to obey
sorridono e cantano anche nelle difficoltasmile and sing even under difficult conditions
sono laboriousi ed economiare hard working and thrifty
sono puri di pensieri, parole ed azioniare pure in thought, word and deeds

References 

 

Organizations based in San Marino
World Association of Girl Guides and Girl Scouts member organizations
World Organization of the Scout Movement member organizations
Youth organizations established in 1973
1970s establishments in San Marino